Kevin Brownell (born August 16, 1998) is a  professional lacrosse player for the Buffalo Bandits of the National Lacrosse League and the Brooklin Redmen of Major Series Lacrosse. Hailing from Millgrove, Ontario, Brownell played collegiality at Robert Morris University, where he received all-Northeastern Conference first team honors. Brownell was drafted in the third round of the 2012 by the Bandits, beginning his rookie season on the practice roster, and working his way up to the active roster. He has played for the Brooklin Redmen since 2010, and has also played for the Burlington Chiefs of the Ontario Junior A Lacrosse League.

References

External links
NLL stats at pointstreak.com

1988 births
Living people
Canadian lacrosse players
Buffalo Bandits players
Robert Morris Colonials athletes